The Two-girls competition of the bobsleigh events at the 2012 Winter Youth Olympics in Innsbruck, Austria, was held on January 22, at the Olympic Sliding Centre Innsbruck. 16 athletes from 6 different countries took part in this event.

Results
The runs was started at 11:00.

References

Bobsleigh at the 2012 Winter Youth Olympics